Ballimore is a small village in New South Wales, Australia. It has a pub and a primary school. It is adjacent to the Talbragar River.

References

Localities in New South Wales
Dubbo Regional Council